Uig is a village at the head of Uig Bay on the west coast of the Trotternish peninsula on the Isle of Skye, Scotland. In 2011 it had a population of 423.

Name
The name is thought to be derived from Old Norse vík, which means bay or inlet. Borrowed via Germanic intermediary  ('harbour town') from Latin  ('village'), Uig shares etymological roots with placenames such as Wick, Highland; Vik, Sogn og Fjordane, Norway; Vík í Mýrdal, Iceland; the suffix -wich, and the word village itself.

Geography
Uig is situated partly on the raised beach around the head of the bay and partly on the steep slopes behind it. Two watercourses enter the bay at Uig: the River Rha from the north and the River Conon which drains Glen Uig to the east. The lower courses of both of these small rivers are characterised by waterfalls.

Uig Tower is a prominent local landmark associated with the Highland Clearances.

Uigg, Prince Edward Island, Canada was named by settlers from Uig.

Transport

Road
Uig is served by the A87 road from Portree and Kyle of Lochalsh to the south and the A855 road which runs northwards around the end of the Trotternish peninsula before also turning south to Portree. As of August 2006, Uig is accessible via intercity buses on Skye, and Scottish Citylink buses, which travel as far south as Fort William and Glasgow.

Ferries

From its sheltered port, Caledonian MacBrayne ferries run to Tarbert on Harris and Lochmaddy on North Uist providing links with the Outer Hebrides.

References

Sources

External links

 Google map
 Google Satellite Photo

Populated places in the Isle of Skye